Valeriy Nikolayevich Chepilko (born  in Yekaterinburg) is a Russian wheelchair curler.

Teams

References

External links 

 (video inside)

Living people
1979 births
Sportspeople from Yekaterinburg
Russian male curlers
Russian wheelchair curlers